Hunton is a village and civil parish about  south of Catterick Garrison and  north west of Bedale, in North Yorkshire, England.  It is part of the Richmondshire district of North Yorkshire, and at the 2001 census had a population of 420, decreasing to 414 at the 2011 census. The name of the village derives from Old English and means the town of the huntsmen, or where the hunts hounds were kept.

The small village's local amenities include a combined post office/village shop and The Countryman's Inn, a pub and restaurant. The village also has a primary school, the Hunton and Arrathorne Community Primary School, which has an Ofsted rating of good.

In 1985 the landlord of the pub started a small traction steam engine gala in the village. It has since become a yearly event and has outgrown the original showground in the village. The Hunton Steam Gathering is now a popular annual event.

There used to be a church in the village (St John's), which was rebuilt in 1794, but it is now a private dwelling. To the north of Hunton is site of a medieval village that it is believed to have been left ruinous either because of raids by Scots or because of the Black Death.

References

External links

Hunton village website
Hunton tourist information
The Countryman's Inn
Primary School webpage

Villages in North Yorkshire
Civil parishes in North Yorkshire